William T. Andrews (1898–1984) was an American lawyer and Democratic politician from New York.

Life
He was born in Sumter, South Carolina, in 1898. Andrews married Regina M. Anderson on April 10, 1926. He was a Special Legal Assistant for the NAACP and was responsible for investigating allegations of Jim Crow discrimination in Hillburn, NY in the 1930s.

He was a member of the New York State Assembly in 1935, 1936, 1937, 1938, 1939–40, 1941–42, 1943–44, 1945–46 and 1947–48.

He died in 1984;

Sources

1898 births
1984 deaths
People from Sumter, South Carolina
People from Manhattan
Democratic Party members of the New York State Assembly
African-American state legislators in New York (state)
20th-century American politicians
20th-century African-American politicians
African-American men in politics